A blanket is a large, usually rectangular piece of thick bedding material.

Blanket or blankets may also refer to:

Types of blanket
 Afghan blanket, a coloured wool knitted or crocheted in geometric shapes

 Blanket sleeper, a one-piece, footed sleeping garment
 Electric blanket, an electrically heated bedding material
 Fire blanket, a device used to extinguish fires
 Hoover blanket (slang), newspaper used as a blanket by an impoverished person
 Saddle blanket, form of horse blanket used as a protective covering for beasts of burden
 Security blanket, any familiar object whose presence provides comfort or security to its owner
 Space blanket, a lightweight reflective material used to keep users warm

Business
 Blanket loan, a type of loan used to fund the purchase of more than one piece of real property
 Blanket order, a purchase order for multiple delivery dates, used when there is a recurring need for expendable goods

Art, entertainment, and media
 Blanket, an album by Urban Species or the title track
 Blankets (comics), a graphic novel by Craig Thompson
 Blankets, an accompaniment album to Thompson's novel by American indie rock band Tracker

Government and politics
 Blanket primary, the voting system employed in the United States
 Blanket protest, a Northern Irish prison protest held in the Maze prison by republican prisoners
 Blanketeers, a nickname given to the operatives involved in a public protest in 1817 England

Places
 Blanket, Texas, United States
 Blanket Independent School District

Plants and animals
 Blanket (grape), another name for the French wine grape Clairette blanche
 Blanket octopus, a species of octopus found in Northern Australia
 Gaillardia pulchella (also called: firewheel, Indian blanket, Indian blanketflower, or sundance), a short-lived annual plant native to the United States

Earth science
 Blanket bog, a bog lying over much of the countryside, formed in cool and very wet climates
 Ejecta blanket, in geology, a layer of ejected material that surrounds an impact crater

Other uses
 Blanket, nickname of Michael Jackson's third child
 Blanket fort, a childhood construction of blankets, bed sheets, pillows, and sofa cushions
 Blanket statement, a hasty generalization
 Blanket stitch, a sewing stitch, typically used to edge blankets
 Blanketing, interference caused by strong radio signals
 Breeding blanket, a key part of many proposed fusion reactor designs
 Markov blanket, a concept in machine learning
 Pigs in blankets, a bacon-wrapped sausage popular in the UK and Ireland
 Pigs in a blanket, a pastry-wrapped hot dog popular in the United States
 Smallpox blanket, an early biological warfare agent used against American Indians

See also
 Horse blanket (disambiguation)